The lesser yellowlegs (Tringa flavipes) is a medium-sized shorebird. It breeds in the boreal forest region of North America.

Taxonomy
The lesser yellowlegs was formally described in 1789 by the German naturalist Johann Friedrich Gmelin in his revised and expanded edition of Carl Linnaeus's Systema Naturae. He placed it in the genus Scolopax and coined the binomial name Scolopax flavipes. Gmelin based his description on the "yellow shanks" seen in the province of New York in autumn that had been described in 1785 by both the English ornithologist John Latham and by the Welsh naturalist Thomas Pennant. The lesser yellowlegs is now placed in the genus Tringa that was introduced in 1758 by the Swedish naturalist Carl Linnaeus in the tenth edition of his Systema Naturae. The name Tringa is the New Latin word given to the green sandpiper by the Italian naturalist Ulisse Aldrovandi in 1603 based on Ancient Greek trungas, a thrush-sized, white-rumped, tail-bobbing wading bird mentioned by Aristotle. The specific epithet flavipes combines the Latin flavus meaning "yellow" with pes meaning "foot". The species is monotypic: no subspecies are recognised.

Description
The sexes are similar both in plumage and in overall size. In breeding plumage the upperparts are mottled with gray-brown, black and white. The underparts are white with irregular brown steaking on the breast and neck. In non-breeding plumage the upperparts are more uniform gray-brown. The legs are yellow. Compared to the greater yellowlegs, the bill is shorter (visually about the same length as the head), slim, straight, and uniformly dark. The breast is streaked and the flanks are finely marked with short bars.

This species is similar in appearance to the larger greater yellowlegs, although it is more closely related to the much larger willet; the fine, clear and dense pattern of the neck shown in breeding plumage indicates these species' actual relationships.

The call of this bird is softer than that of the greater yellowlegs.

Distribution and habitat
They migrate to the Gulf coast of the United States, the Caribbean, and south to South America.
This species is a regular vagrant to western Europe; in Great Britain about five birds arrive each year, mostly between August and October, with the occasional individual overwintering. Their breeding habitat is clearings near ponds in the boreal forest region from Alaska to Quebec.

Behavior and ecology

Breeding

The nest is a depression on dry mossy ground and is usually well hidden. The clutch is normally four eggs. These are buff or gray-brown and are covered in spots of various shades of brown. On average they measure . They are incubated for 22-23 days by both sexes. Both parents brood and care for the precocial young which leave the nest a few hours after hatching. They can feed themselves on departure from the nest. They fly at 23 to 31 days.

Food and feeding
These birds forage in shallow water, sometimes using their bill to stir up the water. They mainly eat insects (such as flies, beetles, water boatmen and mayflies), small fish, crustaceans, aquatic worms, molluscs (such as snails), spiders and seeds.

References

External links
 Lesser yellowlegs species account - Cornell Lab of Ornithology
 Lesser yellowlegs - Tringa flavipes - USGS Patuxent Bird Identification InfoCenter
 
 
 
 

lesser yellowlegs
Native birds of Alaska
Birds of Canada
Birds of Hispaniola
Birds of the Dominican Republic
Birds of South America
lesser yellowlegs
Taxa named by Johann Friedrich Gmelin